Rice Tracts is an unincorporated area and census-designated place (CDP) in Cameron County, Texas, United States. It was first listed as a CDP prior to the 2020 census.

It is in the southern part of the county, bordered to the north and northeast by Brownsville, to the southeast, south, and southwest by Encantada-Ranchito-El Calaboz, and to the northwest by Palmer.

The Resaca del Rancho Viejo, a southeast-flowing tributary of the Rio Grande, winds through the northern half of the community.

References 

Populated places in Cameron County, Texas
Census-designated places in Cameron County, Texas
Census-designated places in Texas